Henry Heyward Isham (4 November 1926 – 18 June 2009), was an American diplomat, Foreign Service Officer and editor. He was the negotiator who played an important role in the talks with North Vietnam that led to the Peace accord of 1973.

Biography 
Heyward Isham was born in New York City on 4 November 1926. His father Ralph Heyward Isham, a noted retired British Army officer and collector of rare books. He graduated from Phillips Academy.

Isham studied International Relations at Yale University, graduating in 1947 before being posted to the American Embassy in Berlin during the Cold War. From 1955 through 1957, he was chief of the consular section and political office at the United States Embassy in Moscow. From 1974 to 1977, after a posting in Hong Kong, Isham was the American ambassador to Haiti.

After his retirement from the diplomatic service he worked as an editor with Doubleday publishers. During this period he supervised the publication of the memoirs of Andrei A. Gromyko, the Soviet foreign minister from 1957 to 1985, and other books by Russians.

Personal life 
He was married to the artist Sheila (née Eaton) with whom he had three children. Son Christopher Isham was named Vice President and Washington Bureau Chief for CBS News in July 2007.  Son Ralph Heyward Isham is the founder and managing director of GH Venture Partners LLC and is a former Fellow with the U.S. Senate Foreign Relations Committee during the SALT II treaty hearings, who served on the staffs of Congressman James W. Symington and Senator Edward Brooke, and is married to designer and artist Ala von Auersperg, daughter of Sunny von Bülow and co-founder of the National Center for Victims of Crime. Daughter Sandra Isham Vreeland was a poet and the director of an AIDS poetry project for youth; she died in 1996.

References 

Ambassadors of the United States to Haiti
Yale University alumni
1926 births
2009 deaths
Phillips Academy alumni
United States Foreign Service personnel
20th-century American diplomats